The ATP Challenger Tour in 2019 was the secondary professional tennis circuit organized by the ATP. The 2019 ATP Challenger Tour calendar had 158 tournaments scheduled, with prize money ranging from $54,160 up to $162,480. It was the 42nd edition of challenger tournaments cycle, and 11th under the name of Challenger Tour.

Schedule 
This was the complete schedule of events on the 2019 calendar, with player progression documented from the quarterfinals stage.

January

February

March

April

May

June

July

August

September

October

November

Statistical information 
These tables present the number of singles (S) and doubles (D) titles won by each player and each nation during the season. The players/nations are sorted by: 1) total number of titles (a doubles title won by two players representing the same nation counts as only one win for the nation); 2) a singles > doubles hierarchy; 3) alphabetical order (by family names for players).

To avoid confusion and double counting, these tables should be updated only after an event is completed.

Titles won by player

Titles won by nation 

1 Hugo Nys switched nationalities during the year to represent Monaco. He won three titles under the French flag and one title under the Monegasque flag.

Point distribution 
Points are awarded as follows:

References

External links 
 Official website
 Calendar

 
ATP Challenger Tour
ATP Challenger Tour